Sašo Nestorov (born June 23, 1987 in Kavadarci) is a Macedonian rifle shooter. Nestorov represented Macedonia at the 2008 Summer Olympics in Beijing, where he competed in the men's 10 metre air rifle shooting. He finished only in last place out of fifty-one shooters for the qualifying rounds, with a total score of 558 points.

References

External links
NBC Olympics Profile

Macedonian male sport shooters
Living people
Olympic shooters of North Macedonia
Shooters at the 2008 Summer Olympics
Sportspeople from Kavadarci
1987 births